

Iran Pro League

Esteghlal 

In:

Out:

Foolad 

In:

Out:

Malavan 

In:

Out:

Mes Kerman 

In:

Out:

Naft Tehran 

In:

Out:

Pas Hamadan 

In:

Out:

Paykan 

In:

Out:

Persepolis 

In:

Out:

Rah Ahan 

In:

  

Out:

Saba Qom 

In:

Out:

Saipa 

In:

Out:

Sanat Naft 

In:

Out:

Sepahan 

In:

Out:

Shahin Bushehr 

In:

Out:

Shahrdari Tabriz 

In:

Out:

Steel Azin 

In:

Out:

Tractor Sazi 

In:

 

Out:

Zob Ahan 

In:

Out:

Azadegan League

Aboomoslem 

In:

Out:

Aluminium Hormozgan  

In:

Out:

Bargh Shiraz 

In:

Out:

Damash Gilan 

In:

Out:

Damash Iranian 

In:

Out:

Esteghlal Ahvaz 

In:

Out:

Etka Gorgan 

In:

Out:

Foolad Natanz 

In:

Out:

Foolad Yazd 

In:

Out:

Gol Gohar 

In:

Out:

Gostaresh Foolad 

In:

 

Out:

Hamyari 

In:

Out:

Iran Javan 

In:

Out:

Machine Sazi Tabriz 

In:

Out:

Mes Rafsanjan 

In:

Out:

Mes Sarcheshmeh 

In:

Out:

Moghavemat Sepasi 

In:

Out:

Nassaji Mazandaran 

In:

Out:

Payam Mashhad 

In:

Out:

Payam Mokhaberat

In:

Out:

Sanat Sari 

In:

Out:

Sanati Kaveh 

In:

Out:

Shahrdari Bandar Abbas 

In:

Out:

Shahrdari Yasuj 

In:

Out:

Sepidrood Rasht

In:

 
 

Out:

Shirin Faraz 

In:

Out:

Tarbiat Yazd 

In:

Out:

References

Iran
transfers
2010-11